Ahmed Benbitour (born June 20, 1946) is an Algerian politician who was Head of Government of Algeria from 1999 to 2000.

Life and career
Born at Metlili, Ghardaïa in the Chaamba Arab tribe, Benbitour received his doctorate from Université de Montréal.

Benbitour served in the government of Algeria as Minister of Energy from 1993 to 1994 and as Minister of Finance from 1994 to 1996. Subsequently, he was Prime Minister from December 1999 until August 2000, when he resigned.

Works
L' Algérie au troisième millénaire, Editions Marinoor (Algérie), 1998

References

External links

"INTERVIEW - Algeria corruption case 'part of political struggle'", Reuters, Lamine Chikhi and Christian Lowe, 09 Feb

1946 births
Living people
Université de Montréal alumni
Prime Ministers of Algeria
Finance ministers of Algeria
Algerian Ministers of Energy and Mines
21st-century Algerian people